Lesnoye is a rural locality (a selo) and the administrative center of Rozhkovsky Selsoviet, Burlinsky District, Altai Krai, Russia. The population was 594 as of 2013. It was founded in 1939. There are 6 streets.

Geography 
Lesnoye is located 50 km northeast of Burla (the district's administrative centre) by road. Ustyanka is the nearest rural locality.

References 

Rural localities in Burlinsky District